The Women's Army Corps (WAC) was the women's branch of the United States Army. It was created as an auxiliary unit, the Women's Army Auxiliary Corps (WAAC) on 15 May 1942 and converted to an active duty status in the Army of the United States as the WAC on 1 July 1943. Its first director was Colonel Oveta Culp Hobby. The WAC was disbanded in 1978, and all units were integrated with male units.

History
The WAAC's organization was designed by numerous Army bureaus coordinated by Lt. Col. Gillman C. Mudgett, the first WAAC Pre-Planner; however, nearly all of his plans were discarded or greatly modified before going into operation because he expected a corps of only 11,000 women. Without the support of the War Department, Representative Edith Nourse Rogers of Massachusetts introduced a bill on 28 May 1941, providing for a Women's Army Auxiliary Corps. The bill was held up for months by the Bureau of the Budget but was resurrected after the United States entered the war. The senate approved the bill on 14 May 1942 and became law on 15 May 1942. The day after President Franklin D. Roosevelt signed the bill he set a recruitment goal of 25,000 women for the first year. That goal was unexpectedly exceeded, so the Secretary of War Henry L. Stimson decided to increase the limit by authorizing the enlistment of 150,000 volunteers.

The WAAC was modeled after comparable British units, especially the ATS, which caught the attention of Army Chief of Staff George C. Marshall. In 1942, the first contingent of 800 members of the Women's Army Auxiliary Corps began basic training at Fort Des Moines Provisional Army Officer Training School, Iowa. The women were fitted for uniforms, interviewed, assigned to companies and barracks and inoculated against disease during the first day.

The WAAC were first trained in three major specialties. The brightest and nimblest were trained as switchboard operators. Next came the mechanics, who had to have a high degree of mechanical aptitude and problem solving ability. The bakers were usually the lowest scoring recruits. This was later expanded to dozens of specialties like Postal Clerk, Driver, Stenographer, and Clerk-Typist. WAC armorers maintained and repaired small arms and heavy weapons that they were not allowed to use.

A physical training manual titled "You Must Be Fit" was published by the War Department in July 1943, aimed at bringing the women recruits to top physical standards. The manual begins by naming the responsibility of the women: "Your Job: To Replace Men. Be Ready To Take Over." It cited the commitment of women to the war effort in England, Russia, Germany and Japan, and emphasized that the WAC recruits must be physically able to take on any job assigned to them.  The fitness manual was state-of-the-art for its day, with sections on warming up and progressive body-weight strength-building exercises for the arms, legs, stomach, neck and back.  It included a section on designing a personal fitness routine after basic training and concluded with "The Army Way to Health and Added Attractiveness" with advice on skin care, make-up and hair styles.

Inept publicity and the poor appearance of the WAAC/WAC uniform, especially in comparison to that of the other services, handicapped recruiting efforts. A resistance by senior Army commanders was overcome by the efficient service of WAACs in the field, but the attitude of men in the rank and file remained generally negative and hopes that up to a million men could be replaced by women never materialized. The United States Army Air Forces became an early and staunch supporter of regular military status for women in the army.

About 150,000 American women eventually served in the WAAC and WAC during World War II. While the conservative opinion in the leadership of the Army was initially opposed to women serving in uniform, as was public opinion, the shortage of men necessitated a new policy. 

While most women served stateside, some went to various places around the world, including Europe, North Africa, and New Guinea. For example, WACs landed on Normandy Beach just a few weeks after the initial invasion.

Slander campaign

In 1943 the recruiting momentum stopped and went into reverse as a massive slander campaign on the home front challenged the WACs as sexually immoral. Many soldiers ferociously opposed allowing women in uniform, warning their sisters and friends they would be seen as lesbians or prostitutes. Other sources were from other women - servicemen and officer's wives' idle gossip, local women who disliked the newcomers taking over "their town", female civilian employees resenting the competition (for both jobs and men), charity and volunteer organizations who resented the extra attention the WAACs received, and complaints and slander spread by disgruntled or discharged WAACs. All investigations showed the rumors were false.

Although many sources spawned and fed bad jokes and ugly rumors about military women, contemporaneous and historical accounts have focused on the work of syndicated columnist John O'Donnell. According to an Army history, even with its hasty retraction, O'Donnell's 8 June 1943 "Capitol Stuff" column did "incalculable damage." That column began, "Contraceptives and prophylactic equipment will be furnished to members of the WAACS, according to a super secret agreement reached by the high ranking officers of the War Department and the WAAC chieftain, Mrs. William Pettus Hobby…." This followed O'Donnell's 7 June column discussing efforts of women journalists and congresswomen to dispel "the gaudy stories of the gay and careless way in which the young ladies in uniform … disport themselves…."

The allegations were refuted, but the "fat was in the fire. The morals of the WAACs became a topic of general discussion…." Denials of O'Donnell's fabrications and others like them were ineffectual. According to Mattie Treadwell's Army history, as long as three years after O'Donnell's column, "religious publications were still to be found reprinting the story, and actually attributing the columnist's lines to Director Hobby. Director Hobby's picture was labeled 'Astounding Degeneracy' …."

Women of color
Black women served in the Army's WAAC and WAC, but very few served in the Navy. African American women serving in the WAC experienced segregation in much the same fashion as in U.S. civilian life. Some billets accepted WACs of any race, while others did not. Black women were taught the same specialties as white women, and the races were not segregated at specialty training schools. The US Army goal was to have 10 percent of the force be African-American, to reflect the larger U.S. population, but a shortage of recruits brought only 5.1 percent black women to the WAC. The first African-American commissioned officer in the WAC was Charity Adams Earley.

Evaluations

General Douglas MacArthur called the WACs "my best soldiers", adding that they worked harder, complained less and were better disciplined than men. Many generals wanted more of them and proposed to draft women but it was realized that this "would provoke considerable public outcry and Congressional opposition", and so the War Department declined to take such a drastic step. Those 150,000 women who did serve released the equivalent of 7 divisions of men for combat. Gen. Dwight D. Eisenhower said that "their contributions in efficiency, skill, spirit and determination are immeasurable". Nevertheless, the slander campaigns hurt the reputation of not only the WAC but other all female Corps like the Navy's WAVES; many women didn't even want it known they were veterans.

During the same time period, other branches of the U.S. military had similar women's units including: the Navy's WAVES, the SPARS of the Coast Guard, United States Marine Corps Women's Reserve, and the (civil) Women Airforce Service Pilots. The British Armed Forces also had similar units including: the Women's Royal Naval Service ("WRENS"), the Auxiliary Territorial Service. and the Women's Auxiliary Air Force.

According to historian D'Ann Campbell, American society was not ready for women in military roles:
The WAC and WAVES had been given an impossible mission: they not only had to raise a force immediately and voluntarily from a group that had no military traditions, but also had to overcome intense hostility from their male comrades. The situation was highly unfavorable: the women had no clear purpose except to send men to the battlefront; duties overlapped with civilian employees and enlisted male coworkers, causing confusion and tension; and the leadership cadre was unprestigious, inexperienced and had little control over women and none over men. Although the military high command strongly endorsed their work, there were no centers of influence in the civilian world, either male nor female, that were committed to the success of the women's services, and no civilian institutions that provided preliminary training for recruits or suitable positions for veterans. WACs, WAVES, SPARS and women Marines were war orphans whom no one loved.

Manhattan Project 
Since early 1943, 422 WACs were assigned to the Corps of Engineers to work on the project. Major General Leslie R. Groves, director of the project, wrote: "Little is known of the significance of the contribution to the Manhattan Project by hundreds of members of the Women's Army Corps ... Since you received no headline acclaim, no one outside the project will ever know how much depended upon you."

Any women interested in positions on the project were told the following: they would be doing a hard job, would never be allowed to go overseas, attend Officer Candidate School, would never receive publicity, and would live at isolated stations with few recreational facilities. A surprising number of highly qualified women responded. It later proved possible to send WACs assigned the Manhattan Project to OCS without compromising security.

WAC Units involved in the effort were awarded the Meritorious Unit Commendation; twenty women received the Army Commendation Ribbon and one, Captain Arlene G. Scheidenhelm, received the Legion of Merit. In addition, all members of the WAAC and the WAC who served in World War II received the Women's Army Corps Service Medal.

Vietnam War
In 1964, the personnel officer at Headquarters, Military Assistance Command, Vietnam (MACV), in Saigon wrote to the director, then Colonel Gorman, that South Vietnam was organizing a Women's Armed Forces Corps (WAFC) and wanted U.S. WACs to assist them in planning and developing it. The MACV commander, then General William Westmoreland, authorized spaces for two WAC advisors. Before the requisitions arrived at the  Pentagon, the MACV personnel officer, Brigadier General Ben Sternberg, wrote to Gorman, offering the advice that "The WAC officer should be a captain or major, fully knowledgeable in all matters pertaining to the operation of a WAC school and the training conducted therein. She should be extremely intelligent, an extrovert and beautiful. The WAC sergeant should have somewhat the same qualities... and should be able to type as well" Gorman replied that the WAC would "certainly try" to send women with "the qualifications you outline." Then, she added, "The combination of brains and beauty is, of course, common in the WAC."

By the time the requisitions arrived at the Pentagon in November 1964, the director had selected Major Kathleen I. Wilkes and Sergeant 1st class. Betty L. Adams to fill the positions. Both had extensive experience in WAC training, recruiting, administration, and command. On 15 January 1965, they arrived in Saigon and were met by Maj. Tran Cam Huong, director of the WAFC and commandant of the WAFC training center and her assistant, Major Ho Thi Ve.

The first WAC advisors advised the WAFC director and her staff on methods of organization, inspection, and management in recruiting, training, administering and assigning enlisted women and officer candidates. Time did not permit the first two WAC advisors to attend language school before they went to Saigon, but those who followed attended a twelve-week Vietnamese language course at the Defense Language Institute, Monterey, California. In 1968, an additional WAC officer advisor was assigned to the WAFC training center located on the outskirts of Saigon. The senior WAC advisor, then a lieutenant colonel and the NCO advisor, then a master sergeant, remained at WAFC headquarters in the city and continued to help the director of the WAFC to develop Corps-wide plans and policies. For additional training, members of the WAFC traveled to the United States. Between 1964 and 1971, 51 Vietnamese women officer candidates completed the WAC Officer Basic Course at the WAC School; one officer completed the WAC Officer Advanced Course.

Another group of WACs was assigned to Saigon beginning in 1965. That year Westmoreland requisitioned 15 WAC stenographers for MACV headquarters. Six arrived by December; the balance reported in over the next few months. Women in grades E-5 and higher with excellent stenographic skills, maturity and faultless records of deportment filled these positions for the next seven years. Peak strength reached 23 on 30 June 1970. The senior among them acted as NCO-in-charge and the senior WAC advisor to the WAFC was their officer-in-charge. Initially. the women were billeted in the Embassy Hotel, but they later moved to other hotels in Saigon. The WAC stenographers served at MACV  headquarters and in support commands throughout the metropolitan area. Like everyone else, they worked six-and-a-half to seven days a week, ten to fifteen hours a day, and had little time for recreation or socializing. Nonetheless, several extended their tours in Vietnam and a few returned for second and third tours of duty.

Early in 1965, Westmoreland had also requisitioned a dozen WAC officers. They filled administrative positions at MACV headquarters, in the support commands and in the headquarters of a new command United States Army Vietnam (USARV). Major Audrey A. Fisher, the first to arrive, was assigned to  the adjutant general's office. Like the enlisted women, the WAC officers lived in hotels in Saigon. They worked in personnel, administration, public information, intelligence, logistics, plans and training, and military justice. A few WAC officers served with the U.S. Army Central Support Command at Qui Nhon and Cam Ranh Bay.

In April 1966, the USARV deputy commanding general, Lieutenant General Jean E. Engler, requested that a WAC detachment be assigned to his headquarters. He asked for 50 (later 100) clerk-typists and other administrative workers, plus a cadre section of an officer and five enlisted women to administer the unit. Some officers in USARV opposed the idea. They believed that the additional security required for women would outweigh the advantages of having the WACs serve in South Vietnam. However Engler won over the critics when he decided to house the WACs inside the U.S. military cantonment area at Tan Son Nhut International Airport rather than in the city, eliminating the need for additional guards. Engler realized that the WACs would be exposed to risk, but he did not consider it great enough to exclude WACs, and he did not request that women being assigned to USARV learn to fire weapons. However, he privately decided that if they were ever assigned to field installations there, he would recommend that they receive small weapons training. Engler's request for a WAC unit was approved by command channels in the Pacific area and at the Pentagon, including the director of the WAC, and, finally, by the chairman of the Joint Chiefs of Staff on 25 July 1966. The WAC cadre arrived in late 1966. First to arrive were 1st Sergeant Marion C. Crawford and the administrative NCO, Sgt. 1st Class Betty J. Benson. The commander, Capt. Peggy E. Ready, the supply sergeant, SSgt. Edith L. Efferson and unit clerks PFC Rhynell M. Stoabs and PFC Patricia C. Pewitt followed. They participated in a ground-breaking ceremony on 2 November for construction of the WAC barracks. Two months later, Army engineers completed eleven quonset huts, called hootches, for living quarters and unit offices. On 12 January 1967, 82 enlisted women who were to serve that first year at Headquarters, USARV, arrived. They were welcomed by the USARV band, the press, photographers, officers and enlisted men from the command. In July 1967 USARV and its component commands, including the assigned WACs, moved to Long Binh Post northeast of Saigon.

In January 1970, the WAC reached its peak strength in South Vietnam with 20 officers and 139 enlisted women. With the progress of Vietnamization and the withdrawal of U.S. forces, by the end of December 1970 the WAC detachment numbered 72; by 31 December 1971 it numbered 46 and by early 1972 it numbered only 35 enlisted women. On 21 September 1972 the Long Binh WAC detachment numbering 13 enlisted women had a standdown ceremony. At the end of December 1972 only two officers and 17 enlisted women remained at MACV headquarters or its subordinate commands and all were withdrawn by March 1973.

Approximately 700 WACs served in South Vietnam with no casualties. The Long Binh detachment received two campaign stars for the Vietnam Counter-Offensive Phase II (1 July 1966 – 31 May 1967) and the Tet Offensive Campaign (30 January 1968 – 1 April 1968).

Disbanded
In 1976, the Women's Officer Candidate School program at Fort McClellan was merged with the Officer Candidate (Branch Immaterial) program at Fort Benning. In the fall of that year the first female cadets started at West Point. The OCS program graduated the first female Army officers before the first West Point cadets graduated in 1980.

The WAC as a branch was disbanded in 1978 and all female units were integrated with male units. Women serving as WACs at that time converted in branch to whichever Military Occupational Specialty they worked in. Since then, women in the US Army have served in the same units as men, though they have only been allowed in or near combat situations since 1994 when Defense Secretary Les Aspin ordered the removal of "substantial risk of capture" from the list of grounds for excluding women from certain military units. In 2015 Jeanne Pace, at the time the longest-tenured female warrant officer and the last former member of the WAC on active duty, retired. She had joined the WAC in 1972.

WAAC ranks 

Originally there were only four enlisted (or "enrolled") WAAC ranks (auxiliary, junior leader, leader, and senior leader) and three WAC officer ranks (first, second and third officer). The Director was initially considered as equivalent to a major, then later made the equivalent of a colonel. The enlisted ranks expanded as the organization grew in size. Promotion was initially rapid and based on ability and skill. As members of a volunteer auxiliary group, the WAACs got paid less than their equivalent male counterparts in the US Army and did not receive any benefits or privileges.

WAAC organizational insignia was a Rising Eagle (nicknamed the "Waddling Duck" or "Walking Buzzard" by WAACs). It was worn in gold metal as cap badges and uniform buttons. Enlisted and NCO personnel wore it as an embossed circular cap badge on their Hobby Hats, while officers wore a "free" version (open work without a backing) on their hats to distinguish them. Their auxiliary insignia was the dark blue letters "WAAC" on an Olive Drab rectangle worn on the upper sleeve (below the stripes for enlisted ranks). WAAC personnel were not allowed to wear the same rank insignia as Army personnel. They were usually authorized to do so by post or unit commanders to help in indicating their seniority within the WAAC, although they had no authority over Army personnel.

WAC ranks 

The organization was renamed the Women's Army Corps in July 1943 when it was authorized as a branch of the US Army rather than an auxiliary group. The US Army's  "GI Eagle" now replaced the WAAC's Rising Eagle as the WAC's cap badge. The WAC received the same rank insignia and pay as men later that September and received the same pay allowances and deductions as men in late October. They were also the first women officers in the army allowed to wear officer's insignia; the Army Nursing Corps did not receive permission to do so until 1944.

The WAC had its own branch insignia (the Bust of Pallas Athena), worn by "Branch Immaterial" personnel (those unassigned to a Branch of Service). US Army policy decreed that technical and professional WAC personnel should wear their assigned Branch of Service insignia to reduce confusion. During the existence of the WAC (1943 to 1978) women were prohibited from being assigned to the combat arms branches of the Army – such as the Infantry, Cavalry, Armor, Tank Destroyers, or Artillery and could not serve in a combat area. However, they did serve as valuable staff in their headquarters and staff units stateside or in England.

The army's technician grades were technical and professional specialists similar to the later specialist grade. Technicians had the same insignia as NCOs of the same grade but had a "T" insignia (for "technician") beneath the chevrons. They were considered the same grade for pay but were considered a half-step between the equivalent pay grade and the next lower regular pay grade in seniority, rather than sandwiched between the junior enlisted (i.e., private – private first class) and the lowest NCO grade of rank (viz., corporal), as the modern-day specialist (E-4) is today. Technician grades were usually mistaken for their superior NCO counterparts due to the similarity of their insignia, creating confusion.

There were originally no warrant officers in the WAC in July, 1943. Warrant officer appointments for army servicewomen were authorized in January 1944. In March 1944 six WACs were made the first WAC Warrant Officers – as administrative specialists or band leaders. The number grew to 10 by June, 1944 and to 44 by June, 1945. By the time the war officially ended in September 1945, there were 42 WAC warrant officers still in Army service. There was only a trickle of appointments in the late 1940s after the war.

Most WAC officers were company-grade officers (lieutenants and captains), as the WAC were deployed as separate or attached detachments and companies. The field grade officers (majors and lieutenant-colonels) were on the staff under the director of the WAC, its solitary colonel. Officers were paid by pay band rather than by grade or rank and did not receive a pay grade until 1955.

There were no chief warrant officer appointments in the WAC during the war because they did not meet the skill or seniority requirements for the rank. However, few servicemen did either. It required ten or more years of time in grade as either a warrant officer (junior grade) – a rank first created in 1941, staff warrant officer – a rank waitlisted since 1936, or an Army Mine Planter Service warrant officer – an Army sea auxiliary unit that was not allowed to recruit women.

List of directors

Women's Army Corps Veterans' Association
The Women's Army Corps Veterans' Association—Army Women's United (WACVA) was organized in August 1947. Women who have served honorably in the Women's Army Auxiliary Corps (WAAC) or the Women's Army Corps (WAC) and those who have served or are serving honorably in the United States Army, the United States Army Reserve, or the Army National Guard of the United States, are eligible to be members.

Notable WACs 

Colonel Geraldine Pratt May (b.1895 – d.1997 [served 1942-19??). In March, 1943 May became one of the first female officers assigned to the Army Air Forces, serving as WAC Staff Director to the Air Transport Command. In 1948 she was promoted to Colonel (the first woman to hold that rank in the Air Force) and became Director of the WAF in the US Air Force, the first to hold the position.

Lt. Col. Charity Adams was the first commissioned African-American WAC and the second to be promoted to the rank of major. Promoted to major in 1945, she commanded the segregated all-female 6888th Central Postal Battalion in Birmingham, England. The 6888th landed with the follow-on troops during D-Day and were stationed in Rouen and then Paris during the invasion of France. It was the only African-American WAC unit to serve overseas during World War II.

Lt. Col. Harriet West Waddy (b.1904-d.1999 [served 1942–1952]) was one of only two African-American women in the WAC to be promoted to the rank of major. Due to her earlier experience serving with director Mary McLeod Bethune of the Bureau of Negro Affairs, she became Colonel Culp's aide on race relations in the WAC. After the war, she was promoted to the rank of lieutenant-colonel in 1948.

Lt. Col. Eleanore C. Sullivan [served 1952–1955] was WAC Center and WAC School commander located at Fort McClellan.

Lieutenant Colonel Florence K. Murray served at WAC headquarters during World War II. She became the first female judge in Rhode Island in 1956. In 1977 she was the first woman to be elected as a justice of the Supreme Court of Rhode Island.

Major Elna Jane Hilliard [served 1942–1946] commanded the 2525th WAC unit at Fort Myer, Virginia. She was the first woman to serve on a United States Army general court martial.

In January, 1943, Captain Frances Keegan Marquis became the first to command a women's expeditionary force, the 149th WAAC Post Headquarters Company. Serving in General Eisenhower's North African headquarters in Algiers, this group of about 200 women performed secretarial, driving, postal, and other non-combat duties. An Army history called this company "one of the most highly qualified WAAC groups ever to reach the field. Hand-picked and all-volunteer, almost all members were linguists as well as qualified specialists, and almost all eligible for officer candidate school."

Louisiana Register of State Lands Ellen Bryan Moore attained the rank of captain in the WACs and once recruited three hundred women at a single appeal to join the force.

Captain Dovey Johnson Roundtree was among 39 African-American women recruited by Dr. Mary Bethune for the first WAACs officer training class. Roundtree was responsible for recruiting African-American women. After leaving the Army, she went to Howard University law school and became a prominent civil rights lawyer in Washington, D.C. She was also one of the first women ordained in the A.M.E. Church.

In February, 1943 Lieutenant Anna Mac Clarke became, when a Third Officer, the first African-American to lead an all-white WAAC unit.

Chief Warrant Officer 4 Elizabeth C. Smith USAF (WAC / USAAF 1944–1947, WAF / USAF 1948–1964) was one of the first WAF warrant officers in 1948.

Chief Warrant Officer 5 Jeanne Y. Pace, was the longest-serving female in the army and the last active duty soldier who was a part of the WAC as of 2011. Her final assignment was Bandmaster of the 1st Cavalry Division where she retired after 41 years of service. She is also a recipient of the Daughters of the American Revolution Margaret Cochran Corbin Award which was established to pay tribute to women in all branches of the military for their extraordinary service with previous recipients including Major Tammy Duckworth, Major General Gale Pollock, and Lt General Patricia Horoho.

Elizabeth "Tex" Williams was a military photographer. She was one of the few women photographers that photographed all aspects of the military.

Mattie Pinnette served as personal secretary to President Dwight D. Eisenhower.

CW4 Amy Sheridan was the first American woman officer to command a United States military aviation company stationed outside of the United States and the first Jewish woman to become a career aviator in the United States Armed Services.

Chief Warrant Officer 5 Tracy Garder was  the last Women's Army Corps Soldier on active duty as of September 2022. Garder received the Legion of Merit in August 2022, she joined Women's Army Corps in 1978, one year before the Corps was integrated in the Army.

Private Marjory Linheart Babinetz was the first WAC to receive the Air Medal in 1944. Mildred Kelly was the first African American woman to serve as an Army sergeant major (1972) and the first female command sergeant major serving at a predominantly male Army installation (1974).

Popular culture

 During the war years, popular comic strip Dick Tracy, drawn by Chester Gould, featured a young WAC spurning the romantic advances of a villain. Likewise Tracy's sweetheart Tess Truehart was a WAC Corporal who helped Tracy capture the German Spy Alfred "The Brow" Brau in 1943.
 A series of cartoon postcards distributed during the war years depicted WACS hitting Adolf Hitler over the head with a rolling pin ["We're Giving Him A Big WAC!"], standing in morning formation exercises ["Don't Worry—Uncle Sam Is Keeping Us in Line!"], and window-shopping for civilian-style dresses ["Just Looking..."]
 The 1945 film Keep Your Powder Dry features Lana Turner joining the WACs, which starred Agnes Moorehead, while sporting uniforms designed by Hollywood designer Irene and hair styled by Sydney Guilaroff.
 The 1949 film I Was a Male War Bride depicts Cary Grant as a French officer who married an American WAC, played by Ann Sheridan and their escapades as he attempts to emigrate to the United States under the auspices of the 1945 War Brides Act.
 1952 film Never Wave at a WAC stars Rosalind Russell, who plays the daughter of a senator, and joins to be closer to her boyfriend in Paris, but her ex-husband causes problems, but she falls back in love with him.
 The 1954 film Francis Joins the WACS stars Francis the Talking Mule, who joins the Women's Army Corps.
 General Blankenship's secretary, Corporal Etta Candy (Beatrice Colen) in the first season of Wonder Woman was a WAC veteran. 
 The song Surrender by Cheap Trick is about a babyboomer child of a former member of the WAC who served in the Philippines.
 Mare's War, a novel by Tanita S. Davis, centers around an African-American girl who joins the WAC.
 On an episode of The Looney Tunes Show, Granny tells Daffy Duck a story where she served as a WAC and prevented the theft of the Eiffel Tower and numerous artworks from The Louvre.
 Miss Grundy, a teacher in the Archie Comics series, was a WAC.
 The Phil Silvers Show makes numerous references to the WACs. Several of the supporting cast, such as Sgt. Joan Hogan (Elisabeth Fraser), are members of the WAC and many of the gags and jokes in the show revolve around women in the army.

See also
32nd and 33rd Post Headquarters Companies
6888th Central Postal Directory Battalion
Air Transport Auxiliary
Army Women's Museum
Women in the Air Force (WAF)
Women in the military
Women in the United States Army
Women's Army Volunteer Corp

Notes

References

 
 
 

 , popular history
 
 , scholarly history of postwar era 
 Permeswaran, Yashila. "The Women's Army Auxiliary Corps: A Compromise to Overcome the Conflict of Women Serving in the Army." The History Teacher 42#1 (2008), pp. 95–111. online
 
  – full text; the standard scholarly history

Primary sources

Further reading

External links

Women in Army History at the United States Army Center of Military History
The Women's Army Corps History Brochure
WAAC/WAC history and WWII women's uniforms in color – World War II US women's service organizations (WAC, WAVES, ANC, NNC, USMCWR, PHS, SPARS, ARC and WASP)
Women Veterans Historical Collection – digitized letters, diaries, photographs, uniforms, and oral histories from WACs
Papers of Fran Smith Johnson, WAC, Dwight D. Eisenhower Presidential Library
The Slander Campaign book chapter by Ann Elizabeth Pfau
WWII: Women in the Fight – slideshow by Life
World War II uniform, Women’s Army Air Force, in the Staten Island Historical Society Online Collections Database
Oral history interview with Gladys Donovan, a WAC from 1943–1946 from the Veterans History Project at Central Connecticut State University
The WAC: The Story of the WAC in the ETO

Uniforms at A History of Central Florida Podcast
Women's Army Corps Veterans' Association—Army Women United, Women's Army Corps Veterans' Association-Army Women United (WACVA-AWU)

 
1942 establishments in the United States
1978 disestablishments in the United States
All-female military units and formations
American women in World War II
Branches of the United States Army
Military history of the United States during World War II
Military units and formations established in 1942
Military units and formations disestablished in 1978
Sex segregation
Women in the United States Army